The Predmestky Festival (also known as Festival de la Predmestky) is a free music and puppet festival held annually in the mountains of western North Carolina.  Early prototypes of the festival in the mid 1980s were called the Doc Locke Rock Fest; in 1995 giant puppets were created for the festival, and an original puppet rock opera was added.

Festivals in North Carolina